The Solothurn–Worblaufen railway is a 29.71 kilometre-long, metre-gauge and electrified railway in the cantons of Bern and Solothurn in Switzerland. The Solothurn–Zollikofen section was opened in 1916 by the Elektrische Schmalspurbahn Solothurn–Bern (Solothurn–Bern Electric Narrow-gauge Railway, ESB), which was merged with the Bern–Zollikofen Railway to form the Solothurn-Zollikofen-Bern Bahn (Solothurn-Zollikofen-Bern Railway, SZB) in 1922. The Zollikofen–Worblaufen line was opened in 1924, allowing trains to run directly between Bern and Solothurn (until then passengers had to change in Zollikofen). The two companies were merged into the Regionalverkehr Bern–Solothurn (RBS) in 1984. Passenger traffic is now integrated into the Bern S-Bahn, while operation of the remaining freight traffic was transferred to SBB Cargo on December 2012.
 
The line is served by line S8 and RE (RegioExpress) services. Worblaufen is the centre of operations and also has a depot and the RBS workshop. All trains run from Worblaufen ro Bern on the Zollikofen–Bern railway .
 
The line is constantly being improved. Except for a short section, there are multiple tracks between Worblaufen and Jegenstorf and between Grafenried and Fraubrunnen.

Operating points

References

Footnotes

Sources
 
 
 

Railway lines in Switzerland
Railway lines opened in 1916
1916 establishments in Switzerland
Metre gauge railways in Switzerland